Choeroichthys cinctus (barred shortbody pipefish) is a species of marine fish of the family Syngnathidae. This species is ovoviviparous, with males carrying eggs in a brood pouch until giving birth to live young.

References

Further reading

Fishes of Australia

cinctus
Marine fish
Fish described in 1976